Serindere is a village in the Ardeşen District, Rize Province, in Black Sea Region of Turkey. Its population is 101 (2021).

History 
According to list of villages in Laz language book (2009), name of the village is Kyaskuri or Chaskuri, which means "cold stream" in Laz language. Most villagers are ethnically Hemshin.

Geography

References

Villages in Ardeşen District